Thaerocytheridae is a family of crustaceans belonging to the order Podocopida.

Genera

Genera:
 Bradleya Hornibrook, 1952
 Dameriacella Liebau, 1991
 Elsacythere Liebau, 1991

References

Podocopida